Darbankhi (Darbanxi; , Yañı Borağan) is a rural locality (a selo) in Gudermessky District, Chechnya.

Administrative and municipal status 
Municipally, Darbankhi is incorporated as Darbankhinskoye rural settlement. It is the administrative center of the municipality and is the only settlement included in it.

Geography 

Darbankhi is located at the interfluve of the Sunzha and Terek rivers.

The nearest settlements to Darbankhi are the city of Gudermes in the south-east, Ilinovskaya in the south-west, Vinogradnoye in the north-west, Chervlennaya-Uzolvaya in the north, and Braguny in the north-east.

Name 
The name Darbankhi comes from the Chechen language and translates roughly as "healing water".

History 
The village of Darbankhi was once called Istisu-Khutor.

In 1944, after the genocide and deportation of the Chechen and Ingush people and the Chechen-Ingush ASSR was abolished, the village of Istisu-Khutor was renamed, and settled by people from the neighbouring republic of Dagestan and other regions. From 1944 to 1957, it was a part of the Gudermessky District of Grozny Oblast.

In 1957, when the Vaynakh people returned and the Chechen-Ingush ASSR was restored, the village regained its old name, Istisu-Khutor.

In 1977,  by a decree of the Presidium of the Armed Forces of the RSFSR, the village at the railway crossing of Braguny, was renamed from Istisu-Khutor and was given its modern name, Darbankhi.

Population 
 1990 Census: 1,713
 2002 Census: 1,683
 2010 Census: 2,101
 2019 estimate: 2,329

According to the results of the 2010 Census, the majority of residents of Darbankhi (1,080 or 51.4%) were ethnic Chechens, 1,005 (47,8%) were ethnic Kumyks, and 16 people (0,8%) did not specify.

Education 
The village hosts one secondary school.

Healthcare 
There is one psychiatric hospital in the village.

References 

Rural localities in Gudermessky District